Dhafir Harris (born August 4, 1977) known as Dada 5000, is a Bahamian-born American who is a former mixed martial artist and internet celebrity with his no holds barred street fight videos. He starred in Dawg Fight which is about street fighting in parts of America which he used to film and take part in. He left this lifestyle and started to take up sanctioned fighting, with his most notable MMA fight against the late Kimbo Slice at Bellator 149.

Harris is the co-founder of the bare-knuckle fighting promotion BYB Extreme.

Mixed martial arts career 
Harris' first fight was against Cedric James where he won by KO in less than 3 minutes of the first round.

Harris' next fight was against Tim Papp where he won by TKO in 50 seconds of the first round.

Bellator 
Harris faced childhood friend turned bitter rival Kimbo Slice in a highly publicized match at Bellator 149. Midway through the first round both fighters would become fatigued, leading to a very uneventful fight. Harris was defeated by way of technical knock out during the waning moments of the third round. Having collapsed at the end of the bout, Harris was removed from the ring on a stretcher and immediately rushed to the hospital. He was later determined to have suffered the results of cardiac arrest, severe dehydration and kidney failure during the contest with Slice. Following two weeks of hospitalization, Harris was released on March 2, 2016. Bellator President Scott Coker stated after the bout that Dada 5000 would not be invited back to fight in Bellator. In March 2016, it was revealed that Slice had tested positive for nandrolone and an elevated testosterone to epitestosterone ratio (T/E ratio) in a pre-fight drug test. The result of the fight was overturned to a no contest.

Promoting career

BYB Extreme Fighting Series 
In April 2019, Harris started his own bare-knuckle fighting promotion in Miami, Florida. Serving as the promoter and face of the organization, BYB Extreme Fighting Series hosted its first event in April 2019; the event was notable for having the self-proclaimed smallest cage in combat sports. Known as the "trigon," the triangular cage debuted at the first event. BYB Extreme Fighting Series' next event "Brawl III: Brawl at the Rock," took place on March 7, 2020. The card was headlined by Chris Barnett taking on Matt Kovacs, with the co-main event being Mike Trujillo taking on Matt Delanoit.

Mixed martial arts record

|-
|NC
|align=center|2–0 (1)
|Kimbo Slice
|NC (overturned)
|Bellator 149
|
|align=center|3
|align=center|1:32
|Houston, Texas, United States
|
|-
|Win
|align=center|2–0
|Tim Papp
|TKO (punches)
|MFA – New Generation 4
|
|align=center|1
|align=center|0:50
|Miami, Florida, United States
|
|-
|Win
|align=center|1–0
|Cedric James
|KO (punches)
|Action Fight League – Rock-N-Rumble 2
|
|align=center|1
|align=center|2:34
|Hollywood, Florida, United States
|
|-

References 

1977 births
American male mixed martial artists
Living people
People from Cat Island, Bahamas
Heavyweight mixed martial artists
Mixed martial artists utilizing boxing
Sportspeople from Miami
Bahamian male mixed martial artists
Bahamian emigrants to the United States